Hansen Yuncken is an Australian construction company, founded in 1918.

Company profile
Since 2006, the company has specialised in sustainable architecture, completing Council House 2 in Melbourne, the world's first 6 star green building, K2 apartments, public housing in Windsor, Victoria and SA Water's headquarters in Adelaide.

The company is engaged in the delivery of PPP projects across Australia, including NSW Schools I PPP, SA Police and Courts, Orange Hospital, Monash University School of Pharmacy PPP and NSW Schools II PPP and SA Super Schools.

In August 2010, Hansen Yuncken was named Australia's Private Business of the Year in BRW Magazine, for companies with more than $100 million turnover. The company also ranked 27 on BRW's 2010 list of Top 500 private companies in Australia.

In 2010 Hansen Yuncken were working on $2.1 billion worth of projects.

By March 2012, they had $3.3 billion worth of projects under management.

Recently the company has started using commercial drones to help their projects due to COVID-19. The amount of drones used is said to increase massively in 2022.

History
Hansen Yuncken was founded in Melbourne, Australia in 1918 by Otto Yuncken and Lauritz Hansen.

In 1925, the company opened a regional branch in Shepparton, Victoria. In 2006 it opened an office in Albury-Wodonga to service regional Victoria and Southern New South Wales. In 1937, Hansen Yuncken expanded into Hobart, Tasmania, then in 1939 an office in Adelaide, South Australia.

The late 1960s saw the opening of its Northern Territory office. A permanent presence was maintained until 2000, at which time it was decided to target only the larger projects in the region. The company also operated an office in Queensland in the early 80s; in 2007 started  in Cairns and in 2009 opened an office in Townsville.

In 1989, the company commenced operations in New South Wales, initially in joint venture, but now operating in its own right. In 2006 Hansen and Yuncken opened an office in Newcastle to serve the Hunter Region.

In 2010 the grandson of Lauritz Hansen, Peter, announced his retirement as chairman of the company. Peter Hansen's son Richard was due to take on a greater management role.

Major projects

Hansen Yuncken has completed numerous landmark buildings across Australia, including:
Adelaide: Adelaide Airport (new terminal), Adelaide Casino, Bicentennial Conservatory within Adelaide Botanic Garden, University of SA - City West Campus, Commonwealth Law Courts, SA Water Building, Telstra House
Melbourne: Melbourne Star, Myer Buildings, National Bank Collins Street, Port Authority Building, Bourke Street, St Patrick's Cathedral Spires, Regent Theatre restoration, Waterfront City Docklands, 50 Flinders Street
New South Wales: Ansett Terminal, Concord Hospital, Orange Hospital, Port Macquarie Arts Centre, Ultimo TAFE, Wolgan Valley Resort, Sydney Fish Market
Queensland: Cairns Airport
Tasmania: , Museum of Old and New Art

References

External links
Hansen Yuncken website
BRW Private Business of 2010

Companies based in Melbourne
Construction and civil engineering companies of Australia
Construction and civil engineering companies established in 1918
Australian companies established in 1918